Berdosso is a village and seat of the Kassa in the Cercle of Koro in the Mopti Region of southern-central Mali.

References

Populated places in Mopti Region